The Scottish Parliamentary Pensions Act 2009 was an Act of the Scottish Parliament to set out rules to govern the Scottish Parliamentary Pension Scheme which was passed by the Parliament on 22 January 2009 and received Royal Assent on 25 February 2009.

See also
List of Acts of the Scottish Parliament from 1999

References

External links

Acts of the Scottish Parliament 2009
Pensions in the United Kingdom
Scottish Parliament